Starsilver Trek is a 1982 fantasy role-playing game adventure published by Judges Guild for DragonQuest.

Contents
Starsilver Trek is an approved supplement for DragonQuest, and this adventure allows a party of dwarves to visit the Frontiers of Alusia on a dwarven quest.

Reception
David McCorkhill reviewed Starsilver Trek in The Space Gamer No. 62. McCorkhill commented that "DQ could use more ordinary adventures just as Alusia could use the detail provided here. Even if you never run the particular quest described here, even if you never had a dwarf in your party, the old grouch who hates other players saying 'Beam me up, Scotty' during a fantasy adventure is the only one who'll not have fun with these encounters."

References

DragonQuest
Fantasy role-playing game adventures
Judges Guild publications
Role-playing game supplements introduced in 1982